Greeks in Serbia number 725 people according to the 2011 census (up from 572 in the 2002 census), and they are recognized as a national minority by the Serbian government. An estimation by the Association of Greeks in Serbia has the number of Serbs of Greek descent at 4,500 people. They are mostly concentrated in four Serbian cities: Belgrade, Smederevo, Niš and Novi Sad. Greek presence is also recorded in Sombor, Pančevo, Subotica, Kragujevac, Požarevac, Bor, Bački Petrovac and Zrenjanin. Many Greeks added the Slavic ending "ić", "ski" or "ev" to their surnames as an assimilation process in SFR Yugoslavia. The first association of Greeks in Serbia was formed in 1923 under the name "Riga od Fere". The first Serb-Greek friendship society was formed in 1934 by Pavle Karađorđević, the friendship society now has over 2,500 members in Serbia.

No illiteracy is recorded among the Greek minority. On occupation, 57.17% are workers, 26.4% are professional workers, 20.2% are professionals and 12.4% are legislators, officials and managers.

History

Middle Ages

During the Early Middle Ages, Serbia was a subject of the Byzantine Empire. The ethnogenesis of Serbs began in the Byzantine-Slavic environment, part of the wider Byzantine commonwealth. In the 11th and 12th centuries, the Serbs began fighting for independence, revolting against the Byzantines. In the following centuries, Serbia was independent and was mostly in friendly relations with Byzantium. Most of the queen consorts were Byzantine women (such as Eudokia Angelina, Simonida, Maria Palaiologina, Irene Kantakouzene, Helena Palaiologina). Some Byzantine families found refuge in Serbia at the end of the 14th and early 15th century, following Ottoman conquests, such as the Angeloi and Kantakouzenos; notable statesmen in the Serbian Despotate of Greek origin include Janja Kantakouzenos, Dimitrije Kantakuzin and Mihailo Anđelović.

Modern history

The first mention of a Greek school in Serbia was in 1718, with Stephanos Daskalos as a teacher at Belgrade. The Greek schools were much respected and were attended by children of famous Serbs. The Greek schools invited language teachers from Greece to teach at primary and secondary schools wherever there was a Greek community such as Karlovac, Smederevo, Zemun, Belgrade, Požarevac, Kragujevac, Novi Sad, Šabac and others. Serbian Patriarch Kalinik II (1765-1766) was an ethnic Greek, and played a crucial role in the Ottoman abolition of the Serbian Patriarchate of Peć in 1766.

Several Aromanian families (from Macedonia) were held captives by the Bulgarians in 1916 in Bulgarian-occupied Požarevac (In Serbia) and stayed until 1918 when the Bulgarian front was breached and they returned to Greece. They worked at the Serbs' vineyards and in the homes of the Jewish merchant-families. However, a number of Greeks remained in Požarevac, who were involved chiefly in commerce and in hotel enterprises, and with great success at that. Some of them became renowned, rich and eminent citizens of the city. Especially as owners of kafeneia (coffee shops), hotels. They gave Greek names to their kafeneia, such as "Itia" (willow tree) or "Kleousa" (weeping willow), "Ta Dyo Lefka Peristeria" (The Two White Doves), or "Kasine". The Greeks and Serbs were Orthodox Christians, and consequently their co-habitation was very good. Very frequently, and early on, weddings between Serbs and Greeks. With the passage of time, the second and third generations of the Greek settlers lost the Greek language, mainly because the Greeks were not living isolated or in groups, but very quickly assimilated into the wider Serbian society.

In May 1945, 4,650 Greek refugees, mostly male members of ELAS, settled in the Maglić village with the help of Yugoslav government. From 1945 to 1948, it was a sui generis case of Greek extraterritorial jurisdiction. The Yugoslav conflict with informbiro saw the Greek community divided between loyalty to Yugoslavia and the Comintern, and those who supported the latter left the country. The remaining 800 also emigrated to Greek Macedonia eventually, with only a few remaining.

Greek politicians and organizations backed Serbia during the Yugoslav Wars. Greek volunteers fought alongside the Serbs in the Greek Volunteer Guard, a company of the Army of the Republika Srpska (ВРС, VRS).

Following the Kosovo declaration of independence
The Greek minority living in Serbia have turned to Greece to not recognize the unilateral secession in Kosovo by the Kosovo Albanians. They stated that the independence of Kosovo would endanger the stability in the Balkans and weaken the traditional Serbian-Greek relations.

The appeal adds that a wrong decision in the matter by the Greek government would "ruin what has taken a long time to build between the two countries".

Culture

The Greek-Serbian families has their own name day. Mixed Serb-Greeks celebrate the Slava (Serbian patron saint veneration) and they all celebrate Annunciation.

The Greek Foreign Ministry asserts that marriages between Serbs and Greeks living in Serbia are quite common, and that this is  both a cause and result of the close bonds shared by many Greeks and Serbs.

Notable people
Bata Paskaljević (1923–2004), Serbian actor, Greek father
Radomir Šaper (1925–1998), Serbian professor, Greek father
Kosta Abrašević (1879–1898), Serbian poet, born in Ohrid, Greek mother
Kosta Kumanudi (1874–1962), Serbian politician and professor, Greek father
Vladan Ðorđević, Prime Minister of Serbia (1897–1900), Greek paternal descent from Macedonia
Fanula Papazoglu, Yugoslav and Serbian historian, born in Bitola, Greek parents
Jovan Sterija Popović (1806–1856), Serbian playwright and poet, Greek father
Konstantin Hadija (fl. 1817–35), secretary of Miloš Obrenović, born in Zemun, Greek grandfather
Naum Krnar (fl. 1804–d. 1817), secretary of Karađorđe, from Thessaly
Vera Jeftimijades-Jobst, Olympic fencer
Dragutin Inkiostri Medenjak, Serbian decorative painter, Greek father
Srđan Šaper, Serbian musician and businessman, Greek grandfather

See also
 Greek–Serbian relations
 Serbs in Greece

References

Further reading
 
 
 Стереотипи о Грцима у српском језику

External links
 Serbian-Greek Friendship Official Site 
 Diogenis Valvanidis: President of Serbian-Greek friendship in Serbia
 Interview with Janis Savas, President of the Association of Greeks in Serbia 

 
Serbia
Ethnic groups in Serbia